Cardinal Spellman High School is the name of several schools including:

Cardinal Spellman High School (Brockton, Massachusetts)
Cardinal Spellman High School (New York City)